The following lists events that happened during 1830 in New Zealand.

Incumbents

Regal and viceregal
Head of State – King George IV dies on 26 June and is succeeded by his brother King William IV.
Governor of New South Wales – General Ralph Darling

Events 
10 January – The first whaling ship, the Antarctic, enters Lyttelton Harbour, which Captain Morell calls 'Cook's Harbour'.
3 February – John Guard arrives in Sydney with a cargo of whale oil, the first to be shipped from the South Island.
21 April – Phillip Tapsell is married to Karuhi, sister of a Nga Puhi chief, by Samuel Marsden.
31 July – William Yate returns from 6 months 'training' in printing at Sydney with a printing press. His attempts at printing are not particularly successful. (see also 1834 & 1835)
19 August – Captain William Stewart leaves for Kapiti Island, where Te Rauparaha has promised him a cargo of flax in return for transporting a large Ngāti Toa party to Akaroa.
26 October – Te Rauparaha and 120 Ngāti Toa warriors leave Kapiti Island for Akaroa on the hired brig Elizabeth.
6 November – After 3 or 4 days hidden aboard the Elizabeth while anchored in Akaroa, Te Rauparaha and his warriors attack and massacre a village of local Kāi Tahu, and then cannibalise them.
November
 – Phillip Tapsell settles in Maketu in the Bay of Plenty and begins trading for flax. (see also 1828)
Undated
John Guard marries Elizabeth 'Betty' Parker in Sydney. She leaves Sydney on the schooner Waterloo on 7 November and arrives at Te Awaiti before the end of the year. Betty Guard is the first European women to settle permanently in the South Island.
A whaling station is operating from Porirua.
Jack Duff, a trader, is the first known European to visit the Palmerston North area. He travels by whaleboat up river as far inland as Woodville and returns to Porirua.
The first inland mission is started at Waimate North.

Births
 2 May (in Ireland): Maurice O'Rorke, politician.
 29 August (in Ireland): Charles Bowen, politician.
 22 October (in Scotland): Arthur John Burns, businessman and politician.
Unknown date
 (in England): Edwin Blake, Member of Parliament
 (in Ireland): Charles Bowen, politician.
 (in England): Henry Miller, politician.
 (in Ireland) Thomas Russell, founder of the Bank of New Zealand

Deaths

See also
List of years in New Zealand
Timeline of New Zealand history
History of New Zealand
Military history of New Zealand
Timeline of the New Zealand environment
Timeline of New Zealand's links with Antarctica

References